Dennis Wliszczak (born February 6, 1978) is a paralympic athlete from Austria competing mainly in category F42 high jump events.

Dennis competed in the high jump in the 2004 Summer Paralympics in Athens winning the bronze medal.

References

Paralympic athletes of Austria
Athletes (track and field) at the 2004 Summer Paralympics
Paralympic bronze medalists for Austria
Living people
Amputee category Paralympic competitors
1978 births
Medalists at the 2004 Summer Paralympics
Paralympic medalists in athletics (track and field)
Austrian male high jumpers